Jan-Lauritz Opstad (4 November 1950 – 21 November 2018) was a Norwegian museum director and art historian.

Biography 
He was born in Sarpsborg, Norway  as a son of Lauritz Opstad (1917-2003).
His father was director of the Norwegian Museum of Decorative Arts and Design.

He had a master's degree in art history from the University of Oslo in 1978 with an assignment on Norwegian enamel art 1880-1914.
In 1979 he was hired as director of the  Nordenfjeld Art Museum     (Nordenfjeldske Kunstindustrimuseum) in Trondheim, a position he held until 2013. His special field is enameling history, and important books include Norsk emalje: Kunsthåndverk i verdenstoppen (1994).

Selected works
Norsk art nouveau (1979)
Ny norsk gullsmedkunst (1983)
En ny bevissthet : norsk kunsthåndverk 1970-1990 (1989)
Norsk emalje : kunsthåndverk i verdenstoppen (1994)
Paa Trondhjemsk vis : selskapskultur og skjulte matskatter fra 1700 til 1900 (2003)

References

1950 births
2018 deaths
People from Sarpsborg
University of Oslo alumni
Norwegian art historians
Directors of museums in Norway